Rabbi Sholom Klass (1916–2000) was the co-founder, publisher and editor of The Jewish Press, a large Jewish circulation newspaper. He also authored Tales from our Gaonim and the halachic work Responsa of Modern Judaism (3 volumes). Rabbi Klass received smicha (rabbinical ordination) from Yeshiva Torah Vodaas. Prior to starting The Jewish Press, he was a co-publisher of The Brooklyn Daily (now defunct).

Legacy
His daughter's "Dear Dad", written for his ninth yahrtzeit, contains examples of one of Rabbi Klass' major accomplishments: the popularization of the use of a dash in writing G-d's name, in English, as the normative form by Orthodox Jews.

He and Rabbi Meir Kahane, whom he hired, broke this barrier, the latter also expanding upon this in the books he authored.

Although Rabbi Klass turned over his halachic Questions & Answers column to his nephew Rabbi Yaakov Klass well before his death, one way in which the column affected worldwide Jewry was as the inspiration of the acronym AYLOR - Ask Your Local Orthodox Rabbi. Some have attempted to change AYLOR by having "O" stand for "Ordained.".

Rabbi Klass' point was that information in his column was meant to educate, not to provide an absolute ruling.

Family
At the time of his passing, he was survived by
 his wife, Irene
 three brothers, Sol, Albert (Anshel, who subsequently lived to 105), and Lionel (Leibel);
 a sister, Rita Rosenthal
 two daughters, Naomi Mauer and Hindy Greenwald; and 
 several grandchildren and great-grandchildren.

Other family members included:
 his sister, Gertrude Siller
 sister-in-law/Albert's wife Hilda

References

External links
 New York Times death notice
 (copyrighted) Photo of the late Rabbi Klass, Z"L

1916 births
2000 deaths
American Orthodox rabbis
American male journalists
20th-century American journalists
20th-century American non-fiction writers
20th-century American male writers
20th-century American rabbis